Sana-ul-Haq (1974/1976 – 23 September 2019), better known as Asim Umar, was an Indian militant and the leader of al-Qaeda in the Indian Subcontinent. al-Qaeda leader Ayman al-Zawahiri announced the creation of AQIS and introduced Asim Umar as its leader in a video posted online in September 2014.

Outside his militant activities he was also an author of what Praveen Swami calls "several best-selling dystopic jihadist fantasies that give fascinating glimpses into the inner world of Islamists", centered on a global conspiracy involving the Dajjal and Jews as well Islamic eschatology.

History
He was born Sana-ul-Haq into an influential peasant family (his grandfather was a village pradhan, his grand uncle a freedom fighter and great-grandfather a district magistrate under the British rule), between 1974-76 in Sambhal, Uttar Pradesh, India. He attended the Darul Uloom Deoband seminary in Uttar Pradesh, India and graduated from there in 1991. In the late 1990s, he visited Pakistan.

Umar studied at Jamia Uloom-ul-Islamia in Karachi and the Darul Uloom Haqqania in Khyber Pakhtunkhwa. His friend in Jamia Uloom-ul-Islamia, Moazzam, said of him that at that time "he was known for his very strong views against democracy and in favor of jihad. He could be described as a version of Anwar Awlaki, who was good in indoctrination too." Before joining militancy, he was himself a teacher in a madrassa in Karachi and used to translate jihadist literature from Pashto to Urdu.

Umar is said to have traveled to Afghanistan where he met Osama bin Laden, and later joined Harkat-ul-Jihad al-Islami (HUJI), a Jihadist group with branches across the Indian Subcontinent. Umar's affiliation with Al-Qaeda was reportedly solidified after the Pakistani government's 2007 storming of the radical Lal Masjid seminary, resulting in the deaths of many militants. He is said to have made contact with Ilyas Kashmiri, a top jihadist with close links to al-Qaeda.

In 2009, Indian intelligence officials visited Asim Umar's house in Deepa Sarai, Uttar Pradesh. Umar was missing for 14 years at that time and was presumed dead. Indian officials informed Umar's family that their son was alive and working for a terrorist organisation. After hearing the news, Umar's father promptly inserted advertisements in newspapers where he disowned his son.

Umar quickly began playing a prominent role as a propagandist in video releases from al-Qaeda and authored at least four books promoting jihad. By April 2014, several months before being named leader of AQIS, Al Qaeda was identifying Umar as the head of its sharia committee in Pakistan.

In September 2014, al-Qaeda leader Ayman al-Zawahiri announced the creation of al-Qaeda in the Indian Subcontinent (AQIS) and introduced Asim Umar as its leader in a video posted online.

In 2016 and 2018, the United States had designated Asim Umar a Specially Designated Global Terrorist in the Specially Designated Nationals and Blocked Persons List.

On 23 September 2019, Afghan officials announced that Asim Umar was killed in a joint US-Afghan military raid in the Afghan Province of Helmand. 40 Afghan civilians and six other al-Qaeda militants were also killed in the raid.

Books
He wrote "a number of conspiracy theory books", centered around Islamic eschatology and the Dajjal, that he himself translated from Urdu into Arabic, Pashto and Uzbek languages, including:
Teesri Jang-e-Azeem Aur Dajjal
Dajjal Ka Lashkar: Black Water 
Imam Mehdi ke Doost aur Dushman 
Bermuda Tikon aur Dajjal

References

Assassinated al-Qaeda leaders
2019 deaths
Indian al-Qaeda members
Tehrik-i-Taliban Pakistan members
Leaders of Islamic terror groups
People from Sambhal district
Indian expatriates in Pakistan
Year of birth missing
1970s births
Indian conspiracy theorists
Jamia Uloom-ul-Islamia alumni
Darul Uloom Deoband alumni
Darul Uloom Haqqania alumni
Specially Designated Nationals and Blocked Persons List
Indian Islamists